Lamotte-Picquet was a French  light cruiser, launched in 1924, and named in honour of the 18th century admiral count Toussaint-Guillaume Picquet de la Motte.

Design and description
The design of the Duguay-Trouin class was based on an improved version of a 1915 design, but was reworked with more speed and a more powerful armament to match the British  and the American  light cruisers. Their crew consisted of 591 men when serving as flagships.

Service history
Completed in 1927, Lamotte-Picquet was based at Brest until 1933, serving with the 3rd Light Division, of which she was flagship. In 1935, she was sent to the Far East, where at the outbreak of war in 1939, she patrolled around French Indochina and the Dutch East Indies.

After the French surrender in Europe, tension developed along the border with Siam (now Thailand). These flared into hostilities between Siam and Vichy France in December 1940. In January 1941, Lamotte-Picquet became the flagship of a small squadron, the Groupe Occasionnel. It was formed on 9 December at Cam Ranh Bay, near Saigon, under the command of Capitaine de Vaisseau Bérenger. The squadron also consisted of the colonial sloops Dumont d'Urville and Amiral Charner, and the older sloops Tahure and Marne. The Groupe Occasionnel with Lamotte-Picquet at its head, met a Thai squadron of two torpedo boats and the coastal defence ship HTMS Thonburi in the Battle of Koh Chang on 14 January 1941. The Thai squadron was defeated, with both torpedo boats sunk and the coastal defence ship run aground. The victory was for naught, however, as the Japanese forced a settlement in the Franco-Thai War in favour of the Thais. Apart from a visit to Osaka, Japan in September 1941, Lamotte-Picquet was thereafter restricted in her activities.

From the next month, Lamotte-Picquet was used as a training hulk. She was sunk in Đồng Nai River, on 12 January 1945, by U.S carrier based aircraft from Task Force 38 during the South China Sea raid. The remains of the hull were scrapped after the war.

Notes

Bibliography

External links 
  L'histoire du croiseur La Motte-Picquet, netmarine

 

Duguay-Trouin-class cruisers
Ships built in France
1924 ships
World War II cruisers of France
Naval ships of France captured by Japan during World War II
Cruisers sunk by aircraft
Maritime incidents in January 1945
Ships sunk by US aircraft